The India national cricket team toured New Zealand from 10 March to 2 April 1994, playing only one Test match, which was drawn. In addition to it, the team played two first-class games and four ODIs. India's 24-day tour began with two first-class fixtures, against New Zealand Emerging Players XI and New Zealand Academy, both of which ended in draws. The one-off Test and the ODI series that followed also ended in draws, the latter seeing India win two matches and New Zealand two.

Background 
The India squad for the tour left for New Zealand on 6 March 1994. The touring party also included manager Ajit Wadekar and administrative manager Ranga Reddy. A day prior to departure, the team had played a charity game against World XI in New Delhi. Having last played in New Zealand four years before, the tour was the first for spinners Anil Kumble and Rajesh Chauhan, wicket-keeper Nayan Mongia, and medium-pacer Salil Ankola. Since the series defeat in that tour, the team had won Test series in different tours both home and away. Under the captaincy of Mohammad Azharuddin, the side also had a particularly successful previous season.

However, New Zealand entered the Test on the back of a series defeat at home against Pakistan, despite winning the final Test. They had also won the final ODI and tieing another in the ODI series that followed. It was reported that Richard Hadlee who had retired from professional cricket and serving as a commentator during the time was asked by Pakistan former cricketer Imran Khan to come out of retirement to play the India series.

Squads 

A 14-member India squad for the tour was announced in early March 1994. Venkatesh Prasad was called up to replace Manoj Prabhakar, who fractured his heel, a few days prior to start of the Test. New Zealand announced its squad for the Test on 13 March. Changes from the side that lost a Test series to Pakistan a few weeks prior, included wicket-keeper Tony Blain who was replaced by Adam Parore, Chris Cairns by Dion Nash and Andrew Jones who retired from Tests, making way for Stephen Fleming, then a  Canterbury player, who was the only new addition to the squad.

Tour matches

Three-day: New Zealand Emerging Players XI v Indians 

India fielded a team without vice-captain Sachin Tendulkar for the match, who was ruled out after he had a boil on his left hand punctured. The New Zealand Emerging Players XI included players who were on the edge of selection for the Test side, except for Blair Hartland who already played for the latter team as an opener. He top-scored for the Emerging Players XI with 98 off 200 balls after his team winning the toss elected to bat; he batted for four-and-a-half hours. Javagal Srinath picked up two wickets despite the pitch not offering much for seamers. Kapil Dev, who had a stiff neck, was not used. The batting side went to stumps at 233/4. In reply, the Indians made 352 with Manoj Prabhakar making 147 off 258 deliveries and Sanjay Manjrekar, 134 off 237, while the others made negligible contributions. The Emerging Players XI had Michael Owens and MF Sharpe bowling well with the second new ball, while others bowled ordinarily, except for Grant Bradburn, who combined with Owens to dismiss the Indians' lower order. Day 3, the final day, ended with the New Zealand Emerging Players XI having made 236/2, in their second innings.

Three-day: New Zealand Academy v Indians 

Sachin Tendulkar, who led the Indians while Mohammad Azharuddin rested, won the toss and put the New Zealand Academy to bat under overcast conditions and moisty pitch. Javagal Srinath of the Indians troubled the New Zealand Academy openers early on with movement off the seam. After having been turned down for lbw, the Academy went to lunch at 46/0 before losing two wickets at tea. Opener Blair Pocock however carried on and reached his fourth first-class century at stumps taking his team's total to 171/4. His team declared at lunch with the score at 253/5 with Pocock himself remaining unbeaten at 139. The Indians were 96/1 at stumps with opener Ajay Jadeja unbeaten at 55, characterized by attacking strokeplay, at the crease. The match ended in a draw after no play was possible on the third and final day due to rain.

Only Test

ODI series

First ODI

Second ODI

Third ODI

Fourth ODI

References

External links
 Tour home at ESPN Cricinfo
 
 Tour Directory at ESPN Cricinfo archives

1994 in Indian cricket
1994 in New Zealand cricket
1993-94
International cricket competitions from 1991–92 to 1994
New Zealand cricket seasons from 1970–71 to 1999–2000